George Steed was a college football and baseball player for the Auburn Tigers. He was a prominent guard for coach Mike Donahue's football team, selected All-Southern in 1915. In a baseball game, Florida quarterback Rammy Ramsdell broke his leg while stepping on Steed's.

References

American football guards
Auburn Tigers football players
Auburn Tigers baseball players